The 2010 Asian Women's Volleyball Cup, so-called 2010 AVC Cup for Women was the second edition of the Asian Cup, a biennial international volleyball tournament organised by the Asian Volleyball Confederation (AVC) with Chinese Volleyball Association (CVA). The tournament was held in Taicang Gymnasium, Taicang, China from 19 to 25 September 2010.

Pools composition
The teams were seeded based on their final ranking at the 2009 Asian Women's Volleyball Championship.

Squads

Preliminary round

Pool A

|}

|}

Pool B

|}

|}

Final round

Quarterfinals

|}

5th–8th semifinals

|}

Semifinals

|}

7th place

|}

5th place

|}

3rd place

|}

Final

|}

Final standing

Team Roster
Wang Yimei, Zhang Lei, Shen Jingsi, Zhang Xian, Wei Qiuyue, Li Juan, Xu Yunli, Xue Ming, Chen Liyi, Ma Yunwen, Bian Yuqian, Fan Linlin
Head Coach: Yu Juemin

Awards
MVP:  Wang Yimei
Best Scorer:  Kim Yeon-koung
Best Spiker:  Kim Yeon-koung
Best Blocker:  Yang Hyo-jin
Best Server:  Chen Wan-ting
Best Setter:  Nootsara Tomkom
Best Libero: Zhang Xian

See also
2010 Asian Men's Volleyball Cup

External links
Asian Volleyball Confederation

Asian Women's Volleyball Cup
Asian Cup
V
V